The inaugural Mixed team normal hill competition of the Beijing 2022 Olympics was held on 7 February 2022 at the Snow Ruyi hill in Zhangjiakou.

In July 2018, the International Olympic Committee (IOC) officially added the mixed team event to the Olympic program.

Summary
Germany were the 2021 World champion, with Norway and Austria being the silver and bronze medalists, respectively. Only one mixed team event was held in the framework of the 2021–22 FIS Ski Jumping World Cup before the Olympics; Slovenia won, followed by Norway and Austria.

The event was won by Slovenia, whose first Olympic gold in ski jumping had been won two days earlier by Urša Bogataj, who was also part of the mixed team. Second was the team of the Russian Olympic Committee, and Canada won the bronze medal. For Canada this medal is historic, as it marked the country's first ever medal in ski jumping at the Winter Olympics. For Russia, it was the first medal in ski jumping as a separate state, and the first medal since 1968, when Vladimir Belousov, representing the Soviet Union, won the large hill competition.

Slovenia, represented by Nika Križnar and Urša Bogataj, 2022 medalists, Peter Prevc, the 2014 silver and bronze medalist, and Timi Zajc, was first in both rounds. Germany, considered the favorite, failed to advance to the second round because Katharina Althaus was disqualified for a suit violation. Japan and Austria also had one jumper disqualified in the first round, and Norway, which was second in the first round, had two jumpers disqualified in the second round. These teams, which also featured Olympic medalists, were thus shifted out of medal contention. As a result, the Russian Olympic committee emerged as a surprising silver medalist, and Canada won bronze, only eight points ahead of Japan.

Schedule

Competition

Qualification

Results
The final started at 19:44.

References

Ski jumping at the 2022 Winter Olympics
Mixed events at the 2022 Winter Olympics